In a Perfect World may refer to:

 In a Perfect World (Aquarium Rescue Unit album), 1994
 In a Perfect World (Kodaline album), 2013
 In a Perfect World..., a 2009 album by Keri Hilson
 "In a Perfect World", a song by Bananarama from their 1986 album True Confessions